It's Easy to Become a Father is a 1926 German silent comedy film directed by Erich Schönfelder and starring Lilian Harvey, Harry Halm and Albert Paulig.

The film's art direction was by Jacek Rotmil. It was made at the Johannisthal Studios in Berlin.

Cast
Lilian Harvey as Harriet
Harry Halm as Lord Douglas
Albert Paulig as Snake
Hans Mierendorff as Thomas A. Unterberry, Kansas City
Franz Egenieff as Lord James Fairfax
Mathilde Sussin as Lady Eliza, Lord Douglas' wife
Julius Falkenstein as commissioner
Robert Négrel as dancer
Gaston Briese as Fred, Lord Douglas' friend
Sig Arno
Max Nosseck
E. Herrmann as Mr. Barklay
Julia Serda as Madame Duverney
Adrienne Wieprecht as Celia Barklay

References

External links

Films of the Weimar Republic
Films directed by Erich Schönfelder
German silent feature films
1926 comedy films
German comedy films
UFA GmbH films
Films shot at Johannisthal Studios
German black-and-white films
Silent comedy films
1920s German films
1920s German-language films